Your Love is Marié Digby's fourth studio album and first for new record label Star Music/MCA Music. It also includes the previously released singles "Say It Again" and "Umbrella". Two official music videos have been released for the single "Your Love" in solo and duet versions.

Track listing

References

Marié Digby albums
2011 albums